Dunn Brothers may refer to:

 Dunn Brothers (bounty hunters), Old West bounty hunters
 Dunn Bros, an American coffeehouse franchise
Dunn Brothers (construction contractors), St. Louis, Missouri builders of the Wachter Motor Car Company Building